Roda Ali Wais is a middle-distance athlete who competed for Djibouti before defecting to Australia.

Ali Wais was only sixteen and the first ever Djiboutian female to represent her country in the Olympics when she competed at the 2000 Summer Olympics held in Sydney, she entered the 800 metres she came last in heat so didn't qualify for the next round. After the race, Ali Wais defected to Australia with the help of a Somali Australian, where she married an Australian and had children. She did not compete for Djibouti again.

References

External links
 
 

1984 births
Living people
Athletes (track and field) at the 2000 Summer Olympics
Olympic athletes of Djibouti
Djiboutian female middle-distance runners